Black Box is a 1978 American short film directed by Scott B and Beth B and starring Lydia Lunch and Bob Mason.

Premise
A man is tortured by his girlfriend and then locked inside a black box.

Reception
According to film scholar Gwendolyn Audrey Foster, Black Box is a "terrifying allegory of societal restriction of the individual."

References

External links

1978 short films
1970s erotic films
American short films
BDSM in films
Films set in New York City
Films shot in New York City
1978 films
American independent films
Punk films
1970s English-language films
1970s American films